Muhittin Kerem Yılmazer (February 2, 1945 – November 20, 2003) was a Turkish actor and singer who was killed in the 2003 terrorist bombings in Istanbul.

References

External links

1945 births
2003 deaths
Deaths by car bomb in Turkey
Turkish murder victims
Turkish male film actors
Turkish terrorism victims
Terrorism deaths in Turkey
People murdered in Turkey
Turkish male television actors
2003 murders in Turkey